Víctor Manuel García Estévez (born April 5, 1981) is a Spanish former racing cyclist.

Biography 
García was born in Miranda de Ebro. After winning the second stage time trial, he won the general classification of the Ruta del Centro in 2017. He also took fourth place in the Vuelta Ciclista de Chile, just behind teammate Efrén Santos, who was the best climber of the event. At the end of this season, he retired from cycling, with his last competition being the Vuelta Ciclista a Costa Rica.

Major results 

2004
 1st Overall Vuelta Ciclista a León
 1st Overall Vuelta a Tenerife
1st Stages 4 & 5 (ITT)
2005
 1st  Road race, National Amateur Road Championships
 1st Overall Vuelta a Tenerife
1st Stage 5 (ITT)
 1st Mémorial Valenciaga
2006
 8th Clásica a los Puertos de Guadarrama
2012
 1st Overall Ruta del Centro
2013
 1st Overall Ruta del Centro
2014
 3rd Overall Vuelta Mexico Telmex
2015
 7th Overall Vuelta Mexico Telmex
1st Stage 4
2016
 3rd Overall Vuelta a Guatemala
 7th Overall Vuelta a Costa Rica
1st Stage 9
 8th Gran Premio de San José
2017
 1st Overall Ruta del Centro
1st Stage 2 (ITT)
 4th Overall Vuelta Ciclista de Chile

References

External links 

1981 births
Spanish male cyclists
People from Miranda de Ebro
Sportspeople from the Province of Burgos
Living people